One Armed Bandit was the second album by the Belgian rock band Zornik. It was released in the year 2004.

Track listing

"Monday Afternoon" – 4:03
"Scared Of Yourself" – 3:42
"Chews You Up, Spits You Out" – 4:28
"Believe In Me" – 3:55
"Closer" – 4:37
"Miracles" – 4:21
"The Place (6 Down, 6 To Go)" – 2:21
"Better Off Without You" – 4:21
"We Are Lost" – 3:47
"Destination Zero" – 4:39
"Goodbye" – 4:25
"What's Wrong?" – 4:20
"Dreams Don't Come Easy" – 16:02

Singles
"Goodbye"
"Scared Of Yourself"
"Believe In Me"

2004 albums
Zornik albums